Gossaigaon is one of the developing town in the Bodoland region of Assam, India. This is a sub-divisional headquarter of Kokrajhar district. It shares its boundaries with the neighboring state West Bengal in the west and Dhubri district to the south. It is one of the BTR's proposed districts. Gossaigaon is well connected by Ground transportation and rails. The town serves as a direct route by road to the state's youngest Rupsi Airport located in the southernmost part of the town. Madati and Sankosh are some of the prominent rivers that flow through the heart of the town, and forested areas include such saleable trees as Shorea robusta (sal), Tectona grandis (teak). This place practices organic farming, also modern agriculture following recent scientific developments.

Geography
It has an average elevation of 50 metres (164 feet). Vegetation is deciduous and evergreen, also grasslands at patches.

Demographics
 India census,  The Gossaigaon Town Committee has a population of 9,068 of which 4,782 are males while 4,286 are females as per report released by Census India 2011.

The population of Children between the ages of 0-6 is 968 which is 10.67% of the total population of Gossaigaon (TC). In Gossaigaon Town Committee, the Female Sex Ratio is 896 against the state average of 958. Moreover, the Child Sex Ratio in Gossaigaon is around 963 compared to the Assam state average of 962. The literacy rate of Gossaigaon city is 90.21% higher than the state average of 72.19%. In Gossaigaon, Male literacy is around 93.94% while the female literacy rate is 86.01%.

Gossaigaon Town Committee has total administration of over 1,935 houses to which it supplies basic amenities like water and sewerage. It is also authorized to build roads within Town Committee limits and impose taxes on properties coming under its jurisdiction.

Most of the residents are members of Scheduled Tribe(P), followed by religious minority communities, then the Adivasi people.

Politics
Gossaigaon is a part of 5 no. Kokrajhar Lok Sabha Constituency. The current sitting Member of Parliament(MP) is Heera Saraniya. The town is a 28 no. Gossaigaon Constituency of the State Legislative Assembly. [[Jiron BaJiron Basumatarysumatary]] elected through the by-election 2021 and is the current serving Member of the Legislative Assembly (MLA) after the actual elected [[Majendra NarzaryMajendra Narzary]]'s demise a week after the declaration of the election results Narzary was elected for the fourth consecutive year. Also a part of 28 no. Soraibil constituency of the Bodoland Territorial Council (BTC). Mrityunjoy Narzary is the sitting Member of the Council Legislative Assembly (MCLA) of the BTC, representing the town.

Education Facilities

Colleges

Gossaigaon College, Since 1971 
Gossaigaon B.Ed College
Gossaigaon Science Academy
Rabi Haji Junior College
Krishna Kanta Handique Open University
Zamduar College

Schools
St. Anthony's English Medium School, Since 1984
Little Star EM School
Sunrise EM School
Bodoland Public School
Blooming Buds School
Bishuram Memorial ME School
Girls' HS School
Shankardev Vidyaniketan School
Boys' HS School

Transportation
Gossaigaon has a railway station named Gossaigaon Hat Railway Station (GOGH) where all the passenger trains halt. Most people from the Gossaigaon area are suffering a lot from getting service from railway facilities. The stoppage of Kamrup Express, Capital Express, North East Express, Bangalore Express, etc. is a long-run demand from the people of Gossaigaon. There is also a Bus stand providing buses and small vehicles for traveling towards different parts of lower Assam and border areas of West Bengal. It is connected to Cooch Behar, Alipurduar, and Siliguri. Also, buses run between Kokrajhar, Bongaigaon, Barpeta, Goalpara and Dhubri. There are a few day super buses that run directly to the main city Guwahati from the town.

Medical
The Ranendra Narayan Basumatary (RNB) Civil Hospital is the biggest government hospital in this area located in the heart of Gossaigaon. It is a 100-bedded hospital and is located in the village Habrubil near SDO(C) office. The hospital has its own fame with the specialist doctors like gynecologists, general surgeons, medicine, Anastasia, dental surgery, etc. Here governmental free laboratory test is also done. There is also a small government hospital in the heart of the town near Gossaigaon Govt. H.S. School named Gossaigaon Community Health Center. 
In the town for treating animals, a good facility for Veterinary services is available. There is a State Veterinary Dispensary and a Block Veterinary Dispensary located near Gossaigaon C.H.C.For smooth official works in veterinary services a "Sub-divisional Animal Husbandry and Veterinary Officer" is located there. The popular veterinary surgeon Dr. T. K. Kalita is now serving the area since 1992 continuously.

Offices

Offices are not much available in Gossaigaon except a few for which the locals are required to approach the Kokrajhar District (viz. RTO, Marriage Registrar, etc.). The Police station, Post Office, Circle Office, Telecom Office, Sub-divisional Police Officer, Sub Divisional Agricultural Officer, Sub Divisional Medical Officer, Sub Divisional Fiscery Officer, Sub Divisional Information and Publicity Officer, Sub Treasury, Sub Register, Labour and Employment Officer, S. I. Official, D. I. Official, Divisional Forest Office, PHE office, APDCL office, SC and ST (P) Development office, Fire and Emergency services office, etc. are located side by side in the main town, and the rest are located in Habrubil in the Local Court premises. The highest authority in the town is the Sub Divisional Officer (SDO Civil), whose office is located in the Court Premises Habrubil. The subdivision is also having an agricultural research station named Regional Agricultural Research Station (RARS) headed by Dr. S Paul located near Telipara 3  km away from the Gossaigaon market. Also having a Krishi Vigyan Kendra (KVK) for the entire district located near the RARS headed by Dr. Monoj Bhuyan, a well-experienced agriculturist. A sub-divisional agricultural office is also located near Babubil village. The Divisional Forest Office is also located near college road. The banking facilities are available in the center. The SBI, UCO Bank, CBI, Bandhan bank, The Assam Co-operative Apex bank, The Assam Gramin Vikash Bank, Axis Bank Ltd, HDFC Bank Ltd., etc. served the people a great for a loan.

Religious places

Temple
Giridhari Ashram
Radha Krisha Mandir
Thakur Anukul Chandra Joyguru Mandir
Shani Mandir
Sitala Devi Mandir
Ramkrishna Ashram
Jagotguru Srimanta Sankardev Namghar
Gosai Baba Dham
Shiv Mandir
Borho Hat Kali Mandir
Uttarpara Hanuman mandir
Tinali Laxmi Mandir
Tinali Viswakarma mandir
Sapot Bridge Kali mandir
Chariali Maa Shyama mandir

Church

Martin Luther Cathedral(MLC) NELC Church
Anthony's Catholic Church
Presbyterian Independent Church
Baptist Church
Pentecost Church

Mosque
Borho Majzid

Playgrounds
U.N Brahma Field
Gossaigaon College Field
Global FC field
HS Field

References

Cities and towns in Kokrajhar district
Kokrajhar